Loco or El Loco may refer to:

Places

United States
 Loco, Georgia, an unincorporated community
 Loco, Oklahoma, a village
 Loco, Texas, an unincorporated community
 Loco Mountain (Labinero, Montana), a mountain peak of the Crazy Mountains in Montana
 Loco River, Puerto Rico

Elsewhere
 Loco, Switzerland, a village and former municipality

People
 Loco (Apache) (1823–1905), Apache chief
 Loco (nickname), a list of people known as "Loco" or "El Loco"
 Joe Loco (1921–1988), American jazz and pop pianist and arranger
 Loco (rapper) (born 1989), South Korean rapper
 Locó (footballer) (born 1984), Angolan footballer Manuel Armindo Morais Cange
 El Loco (wrestler), ring name of Canadian professional wrestler Rami Sebei

Arts and entertainment

Amusement park attractions
 El Loco (Adventuredome), a roller coaster at Adventuredome in Las Vegas
 El Loco (roller coaster), a type of roller coaster manufactured by S&S Worldwide

Fictional characters
 Loco (Gobots), in the Gobots toy line
 Loco (MÄR), in the manga and anime series Märchen Awakens Romance
 Loco, a grasshopper in the 1998 animated film A Bug's Life
 Loco, in the spaghetti western film The Great Silence (1968), portrayed by Klaus Kinski
 Loco, a character in the 1953 film How to Marry a Millionaire, played by Betty Grable

Games
 Loco (video game), a 1984 game for the Commodore 64
 Lego Loco, a 1998 children's computer game

Music
 loco, a musical term meaning "in place"

Albums
 Loco (Fun Lovin' Criminals album), 2001
 Loco (God album), 1991
 El Loco, a 1981 album by American rock band ZZ Top

Songs
 "Loco" (Coal Chamber song), 1997
 "Loco" (David Lee Murphy song), 2004
 "Loco" (Enrique Iglesias song), 2013
 "Loco" (Fun Lovin' Criminals song), 2001
 "Loco" (Joel Fletcher song), 2014
 "Loco" (Jowell & Randy song), 2010
 "Loco" (Itzy song), 2021
 Loco (composition), an orchestral composition by Jennifer Higdon
 "Loco", a 1999 song by Mexican singer Alejandro Fernández from the album Mi Verdad
 "Loco", a 2009 song by Annie from Don't Stop
 "Loco", a 1961 song by Bill Smith Combo
 "Loco", a 2007 song by The Ripps
 "El Loco", a 2001 song by Babasónicos from Jessico

Computing
 Loco Linux, a Linux distribution
 LoCo team, a group of Linux and open source advocates
 LOCO-1, a near-lossless image compression algorithm used in JPEG

Other uses
 Loco (loa), a loa (spirit) in the Voodoo religion
 Locomotive
 Concholepas concholepas, a mollusk species called loco in Chile

See also
 "Loco Loco", a 2021 song by Serbian girl group Hurricane
 LOCOS (LOCal Oxidation of Silicon), a microfabrication process
 Las Vegas Locomotives (Locos), a defunct United Football League team
 Locoweed, an American term for some intoxicating plants, also slang for marijuana
 Loko (disambiguation)